The ExtraTERRORestrial Alien Encounter (often abbreviated Alien Encounter) was a "theater-in-the-round" attraction located in the Tomorrowland section of the Magic Kingdom theme park at Walt Disney World Resort. A co-production between Walt Disney Imagineering and Lucasfilm (then separate from The Walt Disney Company), the attraction was a darkly humorous science fiction experience that used binaural sound to achieve many of its effects. 

After years of declining popularity and increasing complaints from park guests, Disney announced on September 21, 2003 that a new Lilo & Stitch themed attraction would be replacing it. On October 12, ExtraTERRORestrial Alien Encounter was closed to the public to start production on Stitch's Great Escape!.

History
In late 1993, Magic Kingdom announced that ExtraTERRORestrial Alien Encounter would be coming to the park.

The attraction opened briefly for previews on December 16, 1994, on the site of the former Mission to Mars attraction. It was widely criticized by park guests for its violence, storyline and comedic tone of the pre-show in comparison to the darker tone of the actual attraction. On January 12, 1995, the attraction was closed for retooling by then-Disney CEO Michael Eisner, who felt that it was not intense enough. Disney retooled the original version of the second pre-show and main show and spent an extra $10 million for improvements. The second pre-show was reworked to make it match the dark tone of the main show. Imagineers adjusted the show to make sure guests knew what going on, and reprogrammed every computer system with each show element. ExtraTERRORestrial Alien Encounter officially opened on June 20, 1995, as part of the Magic Kingdom's New Tomorrowland renovation.

Upon its opening, some Disney fans praised ExtraTERRORestrial Alien Encounter for its darker tone in contrast to other attractions at Magic Kingdom. However, the attraction was met with largely negative reception from guests, as it was considered too scary for younger kids, and the popularity of the attraction started to dwindle.

On September 21, 2003, Magic Kingdom announced that ExtraTERRORestrial Alien Encounter would be closing. It was set to be replaced by a new attraction based on Disney's 2002 film Lilo & Stitch. ExtraTERRORestrial Alien Encounter closed on October 12, 2003, and was replaced by Stitch's Great Escape!, which opened on November 16, 2004 and operated until January 6, 2018, using much of the same technology and set pieces from its predecessor.

Attraction experience

First preshow area
Guests were ushered into the "Tomorrowland Interplanetary Convention Center" (mentioned as such in the Tomorrowland Transit Authority narration) for a demonstration of new technology from an alien corporation known as X-S Tech. The company's chairman, L.C. Clench (Jeffrey Jones), set the attraction's tone with a pre-show welcome that included his corporate philosophy, "If something can't be done with X-S then it shouldn't be done at all."

Before the start of the pre-show, the television monitors described other events taking place at the Tomorrowland Interplanetary Convention Center, including "The Tomorrowland Chamber of Commerce presents X-S Tech", "Mission to Mars: History or Hoax" (a tribute to the attraction that previously occupied the Alien Encounter building), "Championship Pet Show", and "The Walt Disney Company's Pan Galactic Stock Holders Meeting", featuring a holographic transmission from "Lunar Disneyland—The Happiest Place Off Earth".

Second pre-show area
Guests proceeded into a second area where they were introduced to an X-S robot known as Simulated Intelligence Robotics (SIR), voiced by Tim Curry. He proceeded to demonstrate the company's teleportation technology using a little alien named Skippy. The creature's charred and disoriented appearance after being teleported a short distance across the room suggested that the technology was flawed. While teleporting Skippy back across the room, SIR paused the process, demonstrating how the technology could be used to suspend subjects in teleportation indefinitely.

Main attraction
Finally, guests were seated in harnesses within a circular chamber surrounding an enormous plastic cylinder, the "teleportation tube." Clench and two X-S Tech employees, Spinlok (Kevin Pollak) and Dr. Femus (Kathy Najimy), communicated "live" from across the galaxy via video screens. Initially, a single guest was to be teleported out of the chamber for a meeting with Clench. Instead, Clench decided to have himself teleported into the chamber on Earth to meet the entire group.

Clench's impatience and the change of plans caused the teleportation signal to be diverted through an unknown planet. As a result, a towering, winged and carnivorous alien was beamed into the tube by mistake, as chaos ensued and the technicians panicked. The creature quickly escaped, as intermittent darkness and flashes of light revealed the shattered and empty teleportation tube. A power outage then plunged the chamber into total darkness as guests sat restrained in their seats. A maintenance worker attempted to restore the power, but was mauled as the alien's shrieks resounded throughout the room and a spray of fluid flew out into the audience hitting the guests' faces. After the spray of fluid, the guests felt their seats rumble and shake as the alien made its way swiftly through the crowd, during which time the guests also felt the "breath" of the alien on the back of their necks and drool dripping from its mouth.

The power came back, and with assistance from Spinlok and Dr. Femus, the alien was ultimately driven back into the broken teleportation device, but overpowering the tube caused the alien to explode right before the tube closed. Guests were then released from their seats while the two technicians bid them goodbye and resumed their search for the misplaced Clench. On the way out, guests exited into Merchant of Venus.

Special effects
Unlike Stitch's Great Escape!, much of Alien Encounter took place in total darkness while the attraction operated on the guests' non-visual senses. Most of the effects came from individual units mounted on the shoulder restraints behind audience members' heads. The most common effects were binaural cues which came from the highly separated speakers arranged next to each ear. These speakers bolstered many of the other effects with foley, creating unique effects like positional audio from the monster, and created general atmospherics, including the murmuring and screams of other audience members, pink noise, and heartbeats. The theater's circular design allowed these positional audio effects to be particularly effective, as it prevented individual guests from perceiving that their experiences were not unique.

Binaural sound effects and moving shoulder restraints suggest that the alien is moving through the chamber above the audience. When the alien was meant to be traveling on the far side of the room, "several banks of 1,800-watt-per-channel servo-driven subwoofers" repurposed from the previous attraction, Mission to Mars, and transducers mounted in the seats made pounding vibrations meant to simulate the footsteps of a powerful monster. Warm moistened air was used gently, to simulate the alien breathing down your neck; and forcefully, to induce a more intense reaction from the audience. Water sprinklers and air blasters mounted in the row in front were used to simulate the dripping of either the creature's drool or blood from an attacked worker in the scaffolding above the theater (played by a cast member carrying a flashlight using pre-recorded dialogue) and to simulate the explosion of the monster in the finale when the blast shield does not close in time. Soft textile tubes had air blown through them, causing them to slap against the back of the head of the audience member. This was the most direct physical effect, used in conjunction with the hot air blowers and olfactory emitters to suggest the alien's tongue was licking the audience member's head.

During lighted segments, the show used lasers, rear-projected screens repurposed from the previous attraction, Mission to Mars, and Audio-Animatronics for the alien, SIR, and Skippy (both normal and deformed).

Disneyland
ExtraTERRORestrial Alien Encounter was proposed for Disneyland for the project "Tomorrowland 2055," as part of the "Disney Decade," started by Michael Eisner. It was to be installed in the space that housed the attraction Mission to Mars. Also proposed to join "Tomorrowland 2055" were The Timekeeper, which was to take over Circlevision 360, and also Plectu's Fantastic Intergalactic Revue, a musical revue which was to land where America Sings once was located. Due to financial issues after the opening of Disneyland Paris (then known as Euro Disney), "Tomorrowland 2055" was cancelled. ExtraTERRORestrial Alien Encounter would eventually be planned to come into fruition at Disneyland along with an opening at Tokyo Disneyland and Disneyland Paris over the next few years. These plans were cancelled due to the attraction's negative reviews coupled with budget cuts.

Original concept
The original name for this attraction was Nostromo, a reference to the spacecraft from the 1979 film Alien, with the alien planned to be the titular creature, and X-S Tech was going to be the Weyland-Yutani Corporation. This idea was scrapped because it was deemed too dark and frightening for a Disney attraction, and the Alien series were rated R. This contradicted a rule-of-thumb that Disney attractions are supposed to be based on either G or PG; although, Disney has since developed attractions from franchises that host at least one PG-13 rated film, such as Pirates of the Caribbean, Star Wars, Indiana Jones, Marvel, and Avatar. As a result, the name Nostromo was taken out entirely and an original alien was created for the ride and the fictional company was changed to X-S Tech. However, Disney had acquired the rights to use Alien, so it was used in The Great Movie Ride at Disney's Hollywood Studios, which featured a scene aboard the Nostromo where a frightened Ripley hides behind a wall while the Xenomorph pops out of the walls and ceiling to growl at the riders.

As an original story was developed, George Lucas was brought in to work on the project. This version's storyline had X-S Tech's open house being a front for exposing human guinea pigs to an alien monster they had captured. After the alien menaces the audience for a moment, it is revealed to be sentient and desires to escape its captors and free the guests as well. The X-S scientists respond by trying to destroy the test chamber and leave no evidence, but the alien holds off their weaponry, raises the restraints allowing the guests to escape. While leaving, the sounds of the alien rampaging through the pre-show facilities could be heard. The story's dark tone would lead to it being further re-worked.

Cast
Tyra Banks played the female alien who greets guests in the first preshow video, although her lines were voiced by another actress. Tim Curry voiced the Audio-Animatronic robot SIR in the second preshow area. In the original version, the character was called Technobotic Oratorical Mechanism series 2000 (TOM 2000), was voiced by Phil Hartman, and had a more comical script. Chairman L.C. Clench was portrayed by actor Jeffrey Jones. Dr. Femus is portrayed by actress Kathy Najimy, with Kevin Pollak playing Spinlock.

Other versions
A game within the DisneyQuest indoor interactive arcade at the Walt Disney World Resort called Invasion! An ExtraTERRORestrial Alien Encounter featured some of the X-S Tech mythology, with Chairman Clench (played again by Jeffrey Jones) offering XS-Tech produced walker vehicles to help rescue a group of colonists, although its game play bore no resemblance to the Tomorrowland attraction.

A stage show introduced in Tomorrowland (WDW) called Stitch's Supersonic Celebration (which ran from early May 2009 to late June 2009) referenced X-S Tech and the robot S.I.R, further weaving it into the general Tomorrowland world-building.

References in other attractions
The futuristic SMTV footage that was once used in the queue lines for both Space Mountain at the Magic Kingdom and Space Mountain at Disneyland featured references to X-S Tech.
Stitch's Great Escape!, the replacement attraction for Alien Encounter, had a comical reprisal of Skippy, the Audio-Animatronic alien from the second pre-show area. However, the normal Skippy was moved to the teleportation tube that is (from the view of the animatronic sergeant in this pre-show) on the right hand side of the room, whereas the deformed version (which is teleported into the room) is now in the tube on the sergeant's left, and is meant to be a different creature. The theaters in Stitch's Great Escape! were the same as the ones in Alien Encounter, but had animatronic versions of Stitch and animatronic laser cannons.
Many props from Alien Encounter were reused in Stitch's Great Escape, including the 'broken seat cover'. It had the X-S logo under the words (in AE font) "Temporarily Seized"
In Guardians of the Galaxy – Mission: Breakout! at Disney California Adventure, there is a paper invoice from X-S Tech in the Collector's office.

References

External links
Lost Walt Disney UFO Documentary (Promo film for ExtraTERRORestrial Alien Encounter)
IMDB site for ExtraTERRORestrial promo film

Amusement rides introduced in 1995
Amusement rides that closed in 2003
Former Walt Disney Parks and Resorts attractions
Tomorrowland
Audio-Animatronic attractions
Magic Kingdom
Outer space in amusement parks
1995 establishments in Florida
2003 disestablishments in Florida
George Lucas